A Provincial Lady is a one-act play by Ivan Turgenev. Written in 1850, it was first produced in January 1851 at a benefit performance for the seminal 19th-century Russian actor Mikhail Shchepkin at the Maly Theatre in Moscow.

In the 20th century, the play was produced at the world-famous Moscow Art Theatre as part of a triple bill of works by Turgenev. Constantin Stanislavski directed and played Count Liubin. It opened on 5 March 1912.

References

Sources

 Banham, Martin, ed. 1998. The Cambridge Guide to Theatre. Cambridge: Cambridge UP. .
 Benedetti, Jean. 1999. Stanislavski: His Life and Art. Revised edition. Original edition published in 1988. London: Methuen. .
 Moser, Charles A., ed. 1992. The Cambridge History of Russian Literature. Rev. ed. Cambridge: Cambridge UP. .

1851 plays
Plays by Ivan Turgenev
One-act plays